Shivaraj is a Municipality in Kapilvastu District in the Lumbini Zone of southern Nepal. The former village development committee was transformed into Municipality from 18 May 2014 by merging the existing Birpur, Chanai, Bishunpur,Jawabhari and Shivapur village development committees. At the time of the 1991 Nepal census it had a population of 7241 people living in 1067 individual households.

To promote local culture Shivapur has one FM radio stations Radio Voice – 104.5 MHz, which is a Community radio Station. For the better help another frequency modulation radio has been running with a name, Shivraj FM. It has been giving information about local activities, news and program. Chandrauta is one of the reputed cities located in Shivraj municipality.

References

It lies at the western part of the Nepal and it is crossed over by the east west highway. It lies in 5 no. State at lumbini zone .

Shivaraj municipality, buddhabhumi municipality and the districts and municipality including taulihawa are densely populated.

Populated places in Kapilvastu District
Municipalities in Lumbini Province
Nepal municipalities established in 2014